Double consonant ("doubled consonant", "consonant doubling", etc.) may refer to:

 Gemination, the doubling or lengthening of the pronunciation of a consonant sound
 A digraph consisting of a repeated consonant
 American and British spelling differences involving double consonants